Tom Cunniffe is a Gaelic footballer who plays for Castlebar Mitchels and the Mayo county team.

He started at right corner back in the 2013 All-Ireland final which Mayo lost by a point to Dublin.

Cunniffe later became one of the "well-known names on the New York side" that competes in the Connacht Senior Football Championship, according to the Irish Independent.

References

External links
Mayo GAA Profile

Living people
Castlebar Mitchels Gaelic footballers
Gaelic football backs
Mayo inter-county Gaelic footballers
New York inter-county Gaelic footballers
People from Castlebar
Year of birth missing (living people)